Alain Henri Bernaud (8 March 1932 – 4 December 2020) was a French composer.

Life 
Bernaud was born in Neuilly-sur-Seine of a polytechnician father, a good violinist and violist and a mother playing the piano, daughter of Marcel Chadeigne who was, before and after the First World War, choir conductor at the Paris Opera and pianist - accompanist - decipherer - reducer of orchestral scores.

He had formed with Maurice Ravel, Maurice Delage, Déodat de Séverac, Florent Schmitt, Paul Ladmirault, Émile Vuillermoz, Désiré Inghelbrecht, Ricardo Viñes and Tristan Klingsor, a group they had named Les Apaches, and whose rallying call was whistling the first theme of Borodin's Second Symphony.

He then followed Jules Gentil's piano class (1st medal) - studied harmony with Jacques de La Presle (1st prize) - counterpoint and fugue with Noël Gallon (1st medal and 1st prize) - finally musical composition with Tony Aubin (1st Prix de Rome in 1953 with Ouverture à la française for 2 pianos). He won the 2nd Prix de Rome in 1955 with the cantata Le Rire de Gargantua then 1st Grand Prix de Rome in 1957 with the cantata La fée Urgèle. Bernaud stayed 40 months at the Villa Médicis, a stay during which he wrote a quartet for saxophones, Les chants de la jungle - six melodies for baritone and string orchestra on poems from Rudyard Kipling, a Symphony, an Ouverture pour orchestre de chambre (1960), a Messe brève for mixed choir and organ (1958), a Nocturne pour orchestre à cordes, Sept mélodies pour flûte et mezzo soprano on poems by Omar Khayyam.

Back in France, he wrote scores for television shows Présence du passé, for short films and also feature films and was appointed, in 1963, professor of solfege for instrumentalists at the Conservatoire de Paris, and a little later, in 1971, harmony teacher in the same establishment. He provided this teaching there until the end of 1999. He is currently retired in northern Brittany and continues to compose and put in order his existing production.

Compositions

1950s 
 1951: Sonate pour violon et piano
 1953: Ouverture à la française for 2 pianos
 1955: Concerto lyrique for clarinet and orchestra (Ed. Alphonse Leduc)
 1957: Récitatif et air for clarinet and piano (Ed. Leduc)
 1958: Capriccio rustique for oboe and piano (Ed. Leduc)
 1959: Suite en trois mouvements: Ouverture, Sarabande & Gigue pour grand orchestre
 1959: Chants de la Jungle, after Kipling for baritone and string orchestra (Ed. Combre)

1960s 
 1963: Pavane et saltarelle for trumpet and piano (Ed. Ricordi)
 1964: Humoresque for tuba (or Bb saxhorn or cello) and piano (Ed. Max Eschig)
 1965: Diptyque for oboe and piano (Ed. Leduc)
 1965: Cadence pour le concerto de piano K491 de Mozart (Ed. Musimage)
 1966: D’une extrême gravité, 2 pieces for double bass and piano (Ed. Leduc)
 1967:Trois pièces pour les percussions (Ed. Rideau Rouge)
 1968: Contrastes for viola and piano (Ed. Rideau Rouge)
 1969: Réversibilité for violin and piano (concours J. Thibaud 1969 - Édition Rideau Rouge)

1970s 
 1970: Phantasmes for clarinet and piano (Ed. Rideau Rouge)
 1972: Obliques for cello and piano (Ed. Rideau Rouge)
 1973: Incantation et danse for flute and piano (Ed. Rideau Rouge)
 1973: Magyar for violin and piano (concours Jacques Thibaud 1973 - Ed. Rideau Rouge)
 1974: Sonate pour les deux saxophones, soprano and bariton (Ed. Combre)
 1975: Scherzo pour cor et piano (Ed. Max Eschig)
 1975: Le jardin de Gabriel Six evocations for violin and piano
 1976: Hommage au capitaine Fracasse for percussion and piano (Ed. Rideau Rouge)
 1977: Final pour saxophone alto et piano (Ed. Choudens)
 1978: Hallucinations for bassoon and piano (Ed. Peermusic - E.M.I. 1978)
 1979: Crescendo, progressive pieces for young pianists (Ed. Kercoz)
 1979: Étude-expression for quintet with clarinet

1980s 
 1980: Exponentielles for tenor trombone and piano (Ed. E.M.I.)
 1981: Variations pour hautbois et piano (Ed. Billaudot)
 1984: Rhapsodie pour saxophone alto et piano (Ed. Choudens)
 1986: Dies irae Deus misericordiæ for Large Organ (Ed.Kercoz)

1990–2010 
 1990: Le Miroir d’Euterpe 49 preludes for string quartet (Ed.Kercoz)
 1997: Catalyses, Rhapsody for piano (Ed. Kercoz) musical journey for an exhibition of the painter François Bernaud
 2000: Cinq pièces pour quatuor de violoncelles, in honour of Howard Buten (Ed.Kercoz)
 2004: Variazioni Napoli for baroque harpsichord (Ed.Kercoz)
 2005: Quatre mouvements pour trois archets et douze cordes for string trio (Ed. Kercoz)
 2005: Partita pour violoncelle solo (Ed. Kercoz)
 2008: La flûte Greco Romaine, Seven pieces of progressive difficulty for flute and piano
 2009: Cinq pièces faciles pour guitare
 2009: Partita pour violoncelle solo (Ed.Combre)
 2009: Cinque intermezzi per piano solo
 2009: 33 Basses données pour l'étude du contrepoint fugué

2010–2013 

2010: Suite archaïque for oboe, bassoon and string trio
 2010: Figures de style ou le Clavier bien partagé 50 pieces for four hands piano
 2013: FAGKONZERT for bassoon and string orchestra

For cinema 
 1961: Le Trésor des 13 maisons, TV serials, 13 épisodes
 1962: De la Perse à l'Iran, documentary
 1963: Rien ne va plus, by Jean Bacqué
 1964: Suzanne et le cambrioleur - short film
 1965: Yalta ou le partage du monde, documentary
 1967: Valmy - TV film
 1967: Francis au pays des grands fauves (with Antoine Duhamel), TV serials, 55 épisodes
 1968: L'Homme de l'ombre, TV serials, 6 épisodes
 1968: Nadar, documentary
 1968: Les Sœurs Barenton, short film
 1971: , by 
 1979: Petite histoire un peu triste
 1989: , by Nina Companéez

Awards 
 2nd Prix de Rome for composition 1955.
 1st Grand Prix de Rome for composition 1957.

References

External links 
 Personal website
 Alain Bernaud, Hallucinations for bassoon and piano (YouTube)

1932 births
2020 deaths
People from Neuilly-sur-Seine
20th-century French composers
21st-century French composers
French film score composers
Conservatoire de Paris alumni
Academic staff of the Conservatoire de Paris
Prix de Rome for composition
French male film score composers
20th-century French male musicians
21st-century French male musicians